RC Innsbruck is an Austrian rugby club in Innsbruck, founded in 1997.

Titles
 Austrian Sevens Championships
 2006

Players

Current squad

Internationally Capped Players

External links

Austrian rugby union teams